Rosarno railway station is a railway station of the Italian city of Rosarno, Calabria, part of the Battipaglia–Reggio di Calabria railway.

History 
The station was built by Società per le Strade Ferrate del Mediterraneo as part of the extension of the today known Battipaglia–Reggio di Calabria railway from Gioia Tauro to Nicotera, opened on December 21, 1891.

The original, small, station was after entirely rebuilt during the 1970s in parallel with the construction of the variant direttissima between this station and the Lamezia Terme Centrale station.

Layout 
The station has six tracks, two side platforms and two island platforms, which are connected each other with an underpass. The island platform for tracks 2 and 3, because has an elevator, is the only accessible. The station building features the waiting room, a cafe, the ticket machine area and the toilet.

Services 
The station is served by regional and suburban trains operated by Trenitalia. Also the station is served by:
 Frecciabianca service: Rome - Naples - Salerno - Lamezia Terme - Reggio di Calabria
 InterCity service: Rome - Naples - Salerno - Lamezia Terme - Reggio di Calabria
 InterCity service: Milan - Bologna - Florence - Rome - Naples - Salerno - Reggio di Calabria
 Intercity Notte service: Turin - Milan - Reggio Emilia - Florence - Rome - Salerno - Reggio di Calabria
 Intercity Notte service: Milan - Genoa - Pisa - Salerno - Lamezia Terme - Siracusa

References

External links

Railway stations in Calabria
Railway stations opened in 1891
1891 establishments in Italy
Railway stations in Italy opened in the 19th century